Jiugong  is an area in northern Daxing District, Beijing, located just inside the 5th Ring Road. It borders Huaxiang and Nanyuan Subdistircts to its north and west, Xiaohongmen and Yizhuang Towns to its east, as well as Yinghai and Xihongmen Towns to its south. As of 2020, it had a population of 189,300 under its administration.

During the Ming and Qing dynasties, this area hosted a palace that served as temporary adobe for the emperor. After the fall of Qing dynasty, the palace was destroyed by armies of the Fengtian clique. The region was given the name Jiugong as a result.

History
From 1913 to 1949, it was part of Daxing County, and after the establishment of the People's Republic transferred to Nanyuan District, then established as a township in 1953; five years later Jiugong Township was returned to Daxing County but under the guise of Hongxing People's Commune (红星人民公社). In 1983, the commune was abolished and Jiugong was upgraded to a town in 1990.

Administrative divisions 
As of the year 2021, Jiugong Area consisted of 30 subdivisions, with 28 communities and 2 industrial areas:

See also
List of township-level divisions of Beijing

References

Towns in Beijing
Daxing District
Areas of Beijing